Andrew Whitley Sublette or also, spelled Sublett (1808 – December 19, 1853 or 1854), was a frontiersman, trapper, fur trader, explorer, mountain man and brother to William, Milton, and Solomon, helped establish a trading post with Louis Vasquez in 1835. The present day, Fort Vasquez, located on Highway 85, next to Platteville, Colorado, is a reconstruction. After selling the trading post in 1840, Andrew left the mountains and was seen in El Pueblo around 1844 and 1845 (present day Pueblo, Colorado), traveling along the Arkansas River, following herds of American Bison.

He died in an encounter with a grizzly bear in Southern California on December 19, 1853 or 1854. Sources variously place the site of his death as Santa Monica Canyon or nearby Malibu Canyon.

References

 Lecompte, Janet; Pueblo, Hardscrabble, Greenhorn: Society on the High Plains, 1832—1856; University of Oklahoma Press; Norman; 1978; 
 Noel, Thomas J. and Faulkner, Debra B; Colorado: An Illustrated History of the Highest State; American Historical Press; Sun Valley, California; 2006; ; 
 Brotemarkle, Diane; Old Fort St. Vrain: Diane Brotemarkle; 2001; Johnson Printing; Boulder, Colorado;

External links
Fort Vasquez Official Site

1808 births
1850s deaths
Year of death missing
American fur traders
People from Colorado